William Clarkson (22 September 1891 – 11 December 1954) was an English professional footballer who played as an outside forward in the Football League for Rotherham County, Luton Town, Southport and Burnley.

Personal life 
After retiring from football, Clarkson worked as a commission agent.

Career statistics

References

People from Wombwell
English footballers
Nelson F.C. players
Burnley F.C. players
Rotherham County F.C. players
Luton Town F.C. players
Southport F.C. players
English Football League players
1891 births
1954 deaths
Padiham F.C. players
Sportspeople from Yorkshire
Association football outside forwards
Brentford F.C. wartime guest players
Southport F.C. wartime guest players
Scunthorpe United F.C. players